Takecallis, commonly known as bamboo aphids, is a genus of aphids belonging to the family Aphididae. The genus contains 7 species. All species are restricted to Southeast Asian countries such as China, India, Japan, Korea and Taiwan. Some species were introduced to Western, African and Oceanian countries.

Species
 Takecallis affinis
 Takecallis alba
 Takecallis arundicolens
 Takecallis arundinariae
 Takecallis assumenta
 Takecallis sasae
 Takecallis taiwana

References

Hemiptera of Asia
Sternorrhyncha genera
Panaphidini